This is a list of ambassadors of Israel to Singapore.

Ambassadors
Sagi Karni 2019 - 
Simona Halperin 2017 - 2019
Yael Rubinstein 2013 - 2017
Amira Arnon 2009 - 2013
Ilan Ben-Dov (diplomat) 2005 - 2009
Itzhak Shoham 2001 - 2005
David Danieli 1998 - 2001
Danny Megido 1992 - 1995
Banad Avital 1991 - 1992
Israel Eliashiv 1987 - 1990
Moshe Ben-Yaacov 1983 - 1987
Nahum Eshkol 1978
Itzhak Navon 1976 - 1978
Yhosha Almog 1973 - 1976
Hagai Dikan 1969 - 1971

References

Singapore
Israel